The Magnolia Award for Best Television Series (Chinese:白玉兰奖最佳电视连续剧) is one of the main categories of the Shanghai Television Festival. Gold and Silver awards were created so more series could be recognised, however since 2015, only one television series was given the honor.

Awards Winners & Nominations

Chinese-language series

Foreign TV series

External links
 13th Annual Winners
 14th Annual Winners
 15th Annual Winners
 16th Annual Winners

References

Shanghai Television Festival